Brehe Farmstead Historic District, also known as the Fairview Stock Farm, is a historic home, farm, and national historic district located at Washington, Franklin County, Missouri. The farmhouse was built about 1869, and is a two-story brick dwelling.  The other contributing buildings are the brick smokehouse/ dwelling combination (c. 1865), a frame poultry house (1940s), a large
frame granary (c. 1925), a Quonset barn (ca. 1945), a small frame milk house (c. 1930), and a large gambrel roofed bank barn (c. 1930) with a round ceramic block silo.

It was listed on the National Register of Historic Places in 2000.

References

Historic districts on the National Register of Historic Places in Missouri
Farms on the National Register of Historic Places in Missouri
Houses completed in 1869
Buildings and structures in Franklin County, Missouri
National Register of Historic Places in Franklin County, Missouri